Vinoo Tewarie is a Dutch cricketer. He played a single ODI against Scotland during the World Cricket League. He has also represented the Netherlands at Under 19s level.

References

External List
ESPNcricinfo

1991 births
Living people
Dutch cricketers
Dutch sportspeople of Surinamese descent
People from Purmerend
Sportspeople from North Holland